Ilica is one of the longest streets in Zagreb, Croatia. The busy street is home to many shops and cultural sites and spans through most of the northwestern part of the city, from the Ban Jelačić Square in the city centre westward to the Vrapče district.

The name was first recorded in 1431, while the street itself retained its present shape at the end of the 18th century. In the 14th century, the street was known under the name Lončarska ves (archaic Croatian for "Potters' village", also Vicus lutifigulorum in Latin).

Notable addresses
1 Ilica - 1 Ilica skyscraper
3 Ilica - Croatian Bureau of Statistics
4 Ilica - Nama (formerly Kastner & Öhler) department store
5 Ilica - Palace of the First Croatian Savings Bank with Oktogon
7 Ilica - Metropolitanate of Zagreb and Ljubljana
12 Ilica - British Council in Zagreb
17 Ilica - The Tošo Dabac Archive
36 Ilica - Plavi telefon (Blue Phone), helpline for children and youth
48 Ilica - Democratic Centre party headquarters
85 Ilica - Zagreb Academy of Fine Arts
208 Ilica - EXIT Theater
224 Ilica - Zagrebačka pivovara

References

Further reading

External links

 , article about the history of Ilica street

See also 

 Zagreb
 Academy of Fine Arts Zagreb
 Zagrebačka pivovara

Streets in Zagreb
Shopping districts and streets in Croatia
Donji grad, Zagreb